Grand juries in the United States are groups of citizens empowered by United States federal or state law to conduct legal proceedings, chiefly investigating potential criminal conduct and determining whether criminal charges should be brought. The grand jury originated under the law of England and spread through colonization to other jurisdictions as part of the common law. Today, however, the United States is one of only two jurisdictions, along with Liberia, that continues to use the grand jury to screen criminal indictments.

Generally speaking, a grand jury may issue an indictment for a crime, also known as a "true bill," only if it verifies that those presenting had probable cause to believe that a crime has been committed by a criminal suspect. Unlike a petit jury, which resolves a particular civil or criminal case, a grand jury (typically having twelve to twenty-three members) serves as a group for a sustained period of time in all or many of the cases that come up in the jurisdiction, generally under the supervision of a federal U.S. attorney, a county district attorney, or a state attorney-general, and hears evidence ex parte (i.e. without suspect or person of interest involvement in the proceedings).

The federal government is required to use grand juries for all felonies, though not misdemeanors, by the Fifth Amendment to the United States Constitution. While all states in the U.S. currently have provisions for grand juries, only half of the states actually employ them and twenty-two require their use, to varying extents. The modern trend is to use an adversarial preliminary hearing before a trial court judge, rather than grand jury, in the screening role of determining whether there is evidence establishing probable cause that a defendant committed a serious felony before that defendant is required to go to trial and risk a conviction on those charges.
 
Some states have "civil grand juries," "investigating grand juries," or the equivalent, to oversee and investigate the conduct of government institutions, in addition to dealing with criminal indictments.

History
In the early decades of the United States grand juries played a major role in public matters. During that period counties followed the traditional practice of requiring all decisions be made by at least twelve of the grand jurors, (e.g., for a twenty-three-person grand jury, twelve people would constitute a bare majority). Any citizen could bring a matter before a grand jury directly, from a public work that needed repair, to the delinquent conduct of a public official, to a complaint of a crime, and grand juries could conduct their own investigations. In that era most criminal prosecutions were conducted by private parties, either a law enforcement officer, a lawyer hired by a crime victim or their family, or even by laymen. A layman could bring a bill of indictment to the grand jury; if the grand jury found there was sufficient evidence for a trial, that the act was a crime under law, and that the court had jurisdiction, it would return the indictment to the complainant. The grand jury would then appoint the complaining party to exercise the authority of an attorney general, that is, one having a general power of attorney to represent the state in the case. The grand jury served to screen out incompetent or malicious prosecutions. The advent of official public prosecutors in the later decades of the 19th century largely displaced private prosecutions.

The federal constitutional right to have federal criminal charges screened by a grand jury is one of just a handful of provisions of the federal Bill of Rights that does not also apply to state and local governments.

Federal law

Grand Jury Clause
The Fifth Amendment to the United States Constitution provides that "No person shall be held to answer for a capital, or otherwise infamous crime, unless on a presentment or indictment of a Grand Jury, except in cases arising in the land or naval forces, or in the Militia, when in actual service in time of War or public danger . . . ."

Misdemeanors are not presented to a grand jury, and are instead charged by prosecutor's "information." In the United States armed forces, an Article 32 hearing is used for a similar purpose.

The grand jury right may be waived, including by plea agreement. A valid waiver must be made in open court and after the defendant has been advised of the nature of the charge and of the defendant's rights.

Federal Rule of Criminal Procedure 6
Rule 6 of the Federal Rules of Criminal Procedure governs grand juries. It requires grand juries to be composed of 16 to 23 members and that 12 members must concur in an indictment. A grand jury is instructed to return an indictment if the probable cause standard has been met. The grand jury's decision is either a "true bill" (formerly billa vera, resulting in an indictment), or "no true bill".

Selection
Under federal law, a grand jury must be randomly selected from a "fair cross section of the community" in the location where the grand jury will convene.

The names of potential jurors are drawn at random from lists of voters. The people whose names were chosen, unless exempt or excused, must appear before the court. The judge will then direct the selection of the 23 "qualified" people who will become the final jury.

Secrecy
Grand jury proceedings are secret in accordance with Rule 6(e) of the Federal Rules of Criminal Procedure. No judge is present; the proceedings are led by a prosecutor; and the defendant has no right to present his case or (in many instances) to be informed of the proceedings at all. While court reporters usually transcribe the proceedings, the records are sealed. The case for such secrecy was unanimously upheld by the Burger Court in Douglas Oil Co. of Cal. v. Petrol Stops Northwest, 441 US 211 (1979). The dissenting opinion was joined by Justices Burger and Stewart but concurred with the Court's opinion as to the importance and rationale of grand jury secrecy. Writing for the Court, Justice Powell found that "if preindictment proceedings were made public, many prospective witnesses would be hesitant to come forward voluntarily"; "witnesses who appeared before the grand jury would be less likely to testify fully and frankly"; and "there also would be the risk that those about to be indicted would flee, or would try to influence individual grand jurors". Further, "persons who are accused but exonerated by the grand jury [should] not be held up to public ridicule".

United States v. Procter & Gamble Co., 356 US 677 (1958), permitted the disclosure of grand jury transcripts under certain restrictions: "a private party seeking to obtain grand jury transcripts must demonstrate that 'without the transcript a defense would be greatly prejudiced or that without reference to it an injustice would be done'" and must make its requests "with particularity". Further, First Amendment protections generally permit the witnesses summoned by a grand jury to discuss their testimony, although Dennis v. United States, 384 US 855 (1966), found that such public discussion permits release of the transcripts of their actual testimony.

The Jencks Act, 18 U.S.C. § 3500, requires the government to disclose to the defense any statements made by the accused to the grand jury, and, with respect to non-party witnesses, that after a witness has testified on direct examination at trial, any statement made to the grand jury by such witness be disclosed to the defense.

Investigatory role
The grand jury can compel a witness to testify. The target of a grand jury investigation has no right to testify or put on a defense before the grand jury. The U.S. Attorney's Manual anticipates the possibility of allowing investigatory targets to testify.

The U.S. Attorneys' Manual states that prosecutors "must recognize that the grand jury is an independent body, whose functions include not only the investigation of crime and the initiation of criminal prosecution but also the protection of the citizenry from unfounded criminal charges" and that targets of investigations have the right to, and can, "request or demand the opportunity to tell the grand jury their side of the story."

Special grand jury

United States law also provides for the formation of special grand juries. While a regular grand jury primarily decides whether to bring charges, a special grand jury is called into existence to investigate whether organized crime is occurring in the community in which it sits. This could include, for instance, organized drug activity or organized corruption in government.

State laws
The grand jury clause of the Fifth Amendment has not been incorporated against the U.S. states. As a matter of state law, nearly all states employ some form of grand jury, though only about half require a grand jury indictment to commence a criminal prosecution, and among those, many limit the requirement to felonies or even certain types of felonies. The size of the grand jury and the number of grand jurors required to issue an indictment varies among the states and even, at times, within a single state.

California
The California constitution requires each county to have at least one grand jury impaneled at all times. Grand juries are governed by Title 4 and Title 5 of the California Penal Code, as well as Government Code §3060 and other more general provisions. In addition, grand juries are not subject to the Brown Act.

Most county grand juries in California do not consider criminal matters. A decision to present criminal cases to the grand jury may be made by the county District Attorney, but it is neither a constitutional nor a statutory requirement.

These county-level grand juries primarily focus on oversight of government institutions at the county level or lower. This is why California's grand juries are often called civil grand juries. Almost any entity that receives public money can be examined by the grand jury, including county governments, cities, and special districts.

Each panel selects the topics that it wishes to examine each year. A jury is not allowed to continue an oversight from a previous panel. If a jury wishes to look at a subject that a prior jury was examining, it must start its own investigation and independently verify all information. It may use information obtained from the prior jury but this information must be verified before it can be used by the current jury. Upon completing its investigation, the jury may, but is not required to, issue a report detailing its findings and recommendations.

Most grand juries are seated on a fiscal cycle, i.e. July through June. Most counties have panels consisting of nineteen jurors, some have as few as eleven jurors, others have as many as twenty-three. Due to the length of service, grand jurors are usually selected on a volunteer basis.

The grand jury is required to publish a minimum of one report containing a minimum of one finding and one recommendation. The published reports are the only public record of the grand jury's work; there is no minority report. Each published report includes a list of those public entities that are required or requested to respond. The format of these responses is dictated by California Penal Code § 933.05, as is the time span in which they must respond.

County grand juries develop areas to examine by two avenues: juror interests and public complaints. Complaints filed by the public are kept confidential. The protection of whistleblowers is one of the primary reasons for the confidential nature of the grand jury's work.

Grand juries may charge public officials of "willful or corrupt misconduct in office." The accusation is tried as if it were an indictment, and may not be dismissed for political or extra-legal motives. The definition of "willful misconduct in office" is reserved for serious misconduct, that is, criminal behavior or "purposeful failure to carry out mandatory duties of office."

Florida

In Florida, a capital crime (one for which the imposition of the death penalty is a possible punishment) must be prosecuted by presentment or indictment of a grand jury. Other crimes may be prosecuted by presentment or indictment of a grand jury, but in most cases, prosecution for a non-capital criminal offense is begun by an “information” (charging document) filed under oath by the prosecutor.

Georgia
In Georgia, grand juries are required to issue an indictment in felony cases. They are composed of 16 to 23 people who serve for a fixed term which varies depending on the county. These grand juries hear many different cases during their session. In addition to the well-known criminal functions they carry out, grand juries may also perform civil investigations; they may then issue a report, officially called a general presentment, or in some cases a special presentment.

Georgia law also provides for the formation of special purpose grand juries. Special purpose grand juries are different from regular grand juries in that they are focused on a single topic, may be empaneled for longer, and most importantly, since Kenerly v. State (311 Ga. App. 190, 2011), may not issue indictments; instead they issue a presentment which usually becomes public.

Kentucky

In Kentucky, grand jurors are impaneled in each county, at the Circuit Court level (felonies only) for a four-month term (three panels per year).  During the trial jury orientation for the given four-month term, the grand jurors are selected from the trial jury pool, although the method of selection is not necessarily random.  The meetings are twice a month in most counties (however, grand juries in more populous counties such as Jefferson (Louisville) and Fayette (Lexington) generally meet more often), with each meeting usually going through 20–30 cases in a four- to five-hour period.  The indictment rate is about 98–99%; the grand jury can broaden (about 1% of the time) or narrow (about 3% of the time) the counts in the indictment as well.  Usually, fifteen to twenty grand jurors are required to report to meetings; the hope is that twelve will show to each meeting, which is the number of jurors required to hear cases (an additional juror may be kept as an alternate while other extra jurors are typically excused for the day).  It takes nine yes votes to the question of probable cause to sign a true bill of indictment.  Fewer than nine yes votes either causes a no true bill or a narrowing of the indictment (depending on the votes per count).

The rules are very similar to the federal process; the grand jury usually only hears from law enforcement personnel, with the exception of property crimes, where store detectives or actual victims of theft or vandalism are called to testify.  The only cases brought to the grand jury are those initiated from the Commonwealth's Attorney's office (the prosecutor for felonies).  For the vast majority of cases, the grand jurors generally only hear a recitation of facts from the police report, crime laboratory & medical examiner reports, and other documentation generated during the evidence gathering process.  Grand jurors can ask factual questions of the witnesses and legal questions of the Commonwealth's Attorney or Assistant Commonwealth's Attorney.  The ability to broaden or narrow indictments does technically allow for grand juries to open new avenues of investigation, although since it is dependent on prosecutors for facts, this is very rarely done.  Rules of confidentiality that apply to Kentucky grand jurors are similar to those that apply to federal grand juries.

Louisiana

The law of Louisiana is distinct from the other 49 states; it has a civil law legal system rather than a common law system. The start of a grand jury may be attributed to an 1805 enactment of a law requiring all "crimes, offenses and misdemeanors [to] be taken, intended and construed according to and in conformity with the common law of England." Provisions for a grand jury are spelled out in Article V Section § 34 (a) of the Louisiana Constitution of 1974 which states a grand jury shall consist of twelve members of a community, as peers of an accused, to weigh evidence presented to them to determine whether there is probable cause to charge the person with the offense. Secrecy is also covered, to be stipulated by law. Section  §34 (b) provides for a witness's right to counsel stating, "The legislature may establish by law the terms and conditions under which a witness may have the right to the advice of counsel while testifying before the grand jury."  However, since a witness has no "right to counsel" under the United States Constitution, a Constitutional Amendment would be required to implement this language.

Historically, a grand jury was empowered to investigate crimes committed within its jurisdiction, identify persons suspected of having committed offenses, determine whether there is probable cause to charge the person with the offense, and publish its findings to the court. This has changed over time, most notably in Article 209 of the 1928 Code stating the grand jury "is to investigate non-capital offenses triable within the parish only when called to their attention by the district attorney or the court," and further removing the ability "to act as a censory body of public morals." This effectively relegated the grand jury as a tool of the prosecutor. The 1950 Revised Statutes made a return to an 1870 provision that "any member of the grand jury is required, under penalty of law, to bring to the attention of his fellow members any violation of the criminal law which may have come to his personal knowledge, or of which he may have been informed." This gives the view that a grand jury could initiate investigations or file charges on its own. Privileges against self-incrimination and the fact that a prosecutor can declare Nolle prosequi provides limitations. Although a grand jury may have the right to subpoena and to have persons and documents called before it, this is almost always limited to evidence and witnesses presented by a prosecutor. A grand jury is considered a jury of accusation and the petit jury as the jury of conviction.

A grand jury may be presented with a bill of indictment, before or after a warrant of arrest on an indictable charge, at the discretion of a district attorney. The district attorney then presents evidence and witnesses to prove the charge. A grand jury can return a true bill, no true bill or a third option, "pretermitting entirely the matter investigated". This requires nine of the twelve grand jurors to determine there is not enough evidence presented to determine if a person should or should not be charged with a crime. A grand jury is sometimes referred to as the passive collaborator of a prosecutor or a "rubber stamp" for an indictment, especially if simple acceptance of the bill of indictment is returned as a "true bill."  If a "No True Bill" is presented by a grand jury, the case is usually dropped. If a defendant is incarcerated, unless there are other charges, a prosecutor declares nolle prosequi, resubmits an indictment with new evidence, or brings charges of a lesser crime then, providing there is no gross oversight, the defendant is released. The theory is that if a prosecutor cannot obtain a true bill, presenting the prosecutorial evidence with no defensive rebuttal, then a conviction is not likely.

 Suggestions for improvement
A 1979 National Criminal Justice Reference Service (NCJRS) document identifies three steps that could be taken to remove the adversarial role of the grand jury and make them more independent; (1) giving the target of the grand jury investigation the opportunity to testify; (2) making a grand jury subpoena returnable only when the grand jury is sitting and identifying the general subject area of the investigation; and (3) recording all grand jury proceedings (except the jurors' deliberations), making them accessible for pretrial discovery.

Minnesota
Hennepin County, Minnesota (which contains Minneapolis) keeps a grand jury impaneled at all times. Each grand jury serves a term of four months, typically meets one day each week, and focuses almost exclusively on homicide cases.

New York

In the State of New York, while a person can initially be charged with a felony via a sworn written accusation alone (a "felony complaint"), the state constitution provides a defendant with a right to have all felonies prosecuted by way of a grand jury indictment.  This right can be waived by a defendant, who can then be prosecuted using an indictment substitute called a "superior court information."  Grand juries are composed of between 16 and 23 jurors (16 being a quorum for all proceedings) and indictments require a minimum vote of 12 such jurors.  Grand juries may produce not only indictments but may direct the filing of misdemeanor charges in local courts, the removal of cases to Family Court, and may also issue "grand jury reports" concerning malfeasance of public officials and recommending their discipline.

Both the prosecutor and the grand jury itself have the right to call witnesses to testify before the grand jury.  With few exceptions, every witness who testifies before a grand jury receives transactional immunity automatically, whether they invoke their right to silence or not.  If a grand jury is considering criminal charges against a person, that person has a right to testify before that grand jury, provided they make a timely written demand and then agree to waive their right to immunity.  Despite this fact, an unwitting target of a grand jury proceeding has no right to be informed that their case is even being considered by a grand jury in the first place, unless they have already been arraigned on a felony complaint charging a related crime and are awaiting a preliminary hearing on that complaint. A defendant held in the state may testify to the grand jury.

Virginia
The Commonwealth of Virginia requires that all felonies be presented to a grand jury either directly or, more often, after certification following a preliminary hearing in district court. Commonwealth's attorneys also have the option of obtaining a misdemeanor indictment from a grand jury. Grand juries are a part of the Commonwealth's circuit court system and they meet at the beginning of each court term.

Criticism

Jury makeup
The most persistent criticism of grand juries is that jurors are not a representative sampling of the community, and are not qualified for jury service, in that they do not possess a satisfactory ability to ask pertinent questions, or sufficient understanding of local government and the concept of due process. Unlike potential jurors in regular trials, grand jurors are not screened for bias or other improper factors. They are rarely read any instruction on the law, as this is not a requirement; their job is only to judge on what the prosecutor produced. The prosecutor drafts the charges and decides which witnesses to call.

Limited constitutional rights
The prosecutor is not obliged to present exculpatory evidence in favor of those being investigated before the grand jury. This is because the Supreme Court has held grand juries to be separate from the judicial branch, and therefore not adjudicatory bodies. Four justices dissented to that characterization, stating that the grand jury is "not an autonomous body completely beyond the reach of the other branches," and that the grand jury ought to be subject to the control of  courts.

Individuals subject to grand jury proceedings do not have a Sixth Amendment constitutional right to counsel in the grand jury room, nor do they have a Sixth Amendment right to confront and cross-examine witnesses.  Additionally, individuals in grand jury proceedings can be charged with holding the court in contempt (punishable with incarceration for the remaining term of the grand jury) if they refuse to appear before the jury. Media coverage is not allowed. Furthermore, all evidence is presented by a prosecutor in a cloak of secrecy, as the prosecutor, grand jurors, and the grand jury stenographer are prohibited from disclosing what happened before the grand jury unless ordered to do so in a judicial proceeding.

In 1974 the Supreme Court of the United States held in U.S. v. Calandra that "the exclusionary rule in search-and-seizure cases does not apply to grand jury proceedings because the principal objective of the rule is 'to deter future unlawful police conduct,' ... and 'it is unrealistic to assume that application of the rule to grand jury proceedings would significantly further that goal.'"  Illegally obtained evidence, therefore, is admissible in grand jury proceedings, and the Fourth Amendment's exclusionary rule does not apply.

Intimidation tactic
After a grand jury was commissioned to investigate whistleblowers organization WikiLeaks, grand juries have been accused of being used as an intimidation and persecution mechanism against whistleblowers who have been accused of leaking classified information.

Rubber stamp for the prosecution
According to the American Bar Association (ABA), the grand jury has come under increasing criticism for being a mere "rubber stamp" for the prosecution without adequate procedural safeguards. Critics argue that the grand jury has largely lost its historic role as an independent bulwark protecting citizens from unfounded accusations by the government. Grand juries provide little protection to accused suspects and are much more useful to prosecutors. Grand juries have such broad subpoena power that they can investigate alleged crimes very thoroughly and often assist the prosecutor in his or her job. Grand juries sometimes compel witnesses to testify without the presence of their attorneys. Evidence uncovered during the grand jury investigation can be used by the prosecutor in a later trial. Grand jurors also often lack the ability and knowledge to judge sophisticated cases and complicated federal laws. This puts them at the mercy of very well trained and experienced federal prosecutors. Grand jurors often hear only the prosecutor's side of the case and are usually persuaded by them.

Grand juries almost always indict people on the prosecutor's recommendation.  An unnamed Rochester defense lawyer was quoted in a 1979 newspaper article claiming that a prosecutor could get a grand jury to "indict a ham sandwich", a saying subsequently repeated by the chief judge of New York State's highest court, Sol Wachtler. And William J. Campbell, a former federal district judge in Chicago, noted: "[T]oday, the grand jury is the total captive of the prosecutor who, if he is candid, will concede that he can indict anybody, at any time, for almost anything, before any grand jury."

Police incidents
The grand jury system in the United States came under renewed criticism following three high-profile cases in 2014, where police officers killed Michael Brown, Eric Garner, and Tamir Rice. In all three cases, after being presented evidence, the grand juries voted not to return indictments. Public perception was that the officers involved had failed to follow proper police procedure. As a result, these grand jury decisions sparked protests across the United States.

In 2020, a grand jury returned no charges for the police killing of Breonna Taylor. That result too sparked protests across the United States, especially in Louisville, Kentucky, the city where the incident took place. It also led to criticism of Kentucky Attorney General Daniel Cameron, who supported the result, as well as calls for the grand jury transcript to be released to the public.

Suggested reform of federal grand jury system 

Due to the criticism against the federal grand jury system there are some reform proposals which include the following proposals:

 Better instructions from judges to jurors about the grand jury's powers and its independence from prosecutors
 Increased access to grand jury transcripts for suspects who are eventually indicted
 Expanded safeguards against abuse of witnesses, including education about their rights and the presence of their attorneys
 Notification of targets of investigations that they are targets
 Optional rather than mandatory appearances by targets of investigations
 An end to the requirement that prosecutors present defense evidence, and replacement with a requirement that grand jurors be informed that the defense was not represented in the hearing.

Besides the above stated reform proposals, the National Association of Criminal Defense Lawyers (NACDL) established The Commission to Reform the Federal Grand Jury, a bi-partisan, blue-ribbon panel that included current and former prosecutors, as well as academics and defense attorneys. The unanimous conclusions and proposals of this diverse group were contained in the publication Federal Grand Jury Reform Report & 'Bill of Rights'''. Among the reforms detailed in that report were the right to counsel for grand jury witnesses who are not receiving immunity, an obligation to present evidence which may exonerate the target or subject of the offense, and the right for targets or subjects to testify.

Researchers Erin Crites, Jon Gould and Colleen Shepard of the Center for Justice, Law & Society at George Mason University studied the experiences of prosecutors, defense lawyers, and retired judges in New York and Colorado. Four key reform recommendations emerged from their Evaluating Grand Jury Reform in Two States: The Case for Reform research study are:
Defense representation in the grand jury room,
production of witness transcripts for the defense,
advance notice for witnesses to appear, and 
the presentation of exculpatory evidence to the grand jury.

The Cato Institute, an American libertarian think tank headquartered in Washington, D.C., presented a report, A Grand Facade: How the Grand Jury was Captured by Government which addresses the history of, problems with, and reforms for the grand jury system.

"Runaway" grand jury
Occasionally, grand juries go aggressively beyond the control of the prosecuting attorney. When the grand jury does so the situation is called a "runaway" grand jury. Runaway grand juries sometimes happen in government corruption or organized crime cases if the grand jury comes to believe that the prosecutor himself has been improperly influenced. Such cases were common in the 19th century but have become infrequent since the 1930s.

The 1935 Runaway Grand Jury in New York County was investigating gambling and mobster Dutch Schultz when jury members complained in open court that prosecutors were not pursuing obvious leads and hinted that the district attorney was possibly receiving payoffs. Thomas E. Dewey was appointed as an independent prosecutor.

In media
In the Perry Mason episode "The Case of the Fraudulent Foto", Mason's client is a district attorney. When the DA is arrested, Mason substitutes for him in a grand jury investigation.

In The Rockford Files episode "So Help Me God", Rockford is subpoenaed to testify before a grand jury. The episode shows the viewer the shortcomings of the grand jury system, specifically relating to the Fifth Amendment.

Scott Turow's second novel The Burden of Proof'' deals extensively with the workings and shortcomings of the federal grand jury system in a fictional county in Illinois. Turow is himself a practicing lawyer and acted as an Assistant U.S. Attorney in Chicago between 1978 and 1986.

References

External links
 California Grand Jurors' Association – Contains information specific to California and grand juries in general.
 Professor Brenner's Law Review Article - Provides an indepth history about grand juries in the United States